Mendibil is a hamlet and concejo located in the municipality of Arratzua-Ubarrundia, in Álava province, Basque Country, Spain.

References

External links
 

Concejos in Arratzua-Ubarrundia